The Skull Beneath The Skin is a 1982 detective novel by P. D. James, featuring her female private detective Cordelia Gray. The novel is set in a reconstructed Victorian castle on the fictional Courcy Island on the Dorset coast and centers around actress Clarissa Lisle who is to play John Webster's drama The Duchess of Malfi in the castle's restored theatre. It takes its title from T. S. Eliot's poem Whispers of Immortality, where Webster is famously said to be "much possessed by death" and to see "the skull beneath the skin".

Plot summary

Cordelia Gray is engaged by Sir George Ralston, a baronet and World War II hero, to accompany his wife, the acclaimed actress Clarissa Lisle, for a weekend at Courcy Castle on the island of the same name on the Dorset coast. Clarissa has been receiving thinly veiled death threats in form of quotations from plays where she played the main role.

Shortly before the performance of The Duchess of Malfi, Clarissa is brutally murdered, leaving Cordelia and the Dorset CID to deal with solving the crime.

Characters

Cordelia Gray

Cordelia Gray is the heroine/detective of the story. The book is written mainly from her point of view.
Cordelia is the owner of the none too successful Pryde's Detective Agency (named for her old boss/mentor, Bernie Pryde, who has committed suicide and left the business to her). With business in a lull, she and her two staff members, Bevis and Miss Maudsley, have been reduced to finding missing pets, at which they are quite successful.

Cordelia is hired by Clarissa Lisle's husband, Sir George Ralston, to discover who has been sending her threatening letters.
However, when Clarissa is suddenly murdered, she feels duty bound to solve the mystery of why and by whom Clarissa was killed.

Sir George Ralston

The last of Clarissa Lisle's many husbands. A former soldier, he has a 'dark' history on Courcy Island.
He is "A little over sixty", conservative, well groomed, and formal. 
He employs Cordelia as a sop to his wife's insecurities, never suspecting that she has any serious enemies.

Clarissa Lisle

Clarissa is an actress with a long history of theatre work, especially in Shakespeare. Previously married three times, and through one of these marriages left in charge of a stepson, Simon Lessing, at the time of her death she is married to Sir George Ralston.
Prior to the hiring of Cordelia, she has been receiving threatening letters, consisting of verse quotations on the theme of death and decay derived from a play she had appeared in, accompanied by a crude drawing, on untraceable paper.
As a result of this intimidation campaign she is losing her nerve on stage, which threatens to jeopardise her career.

While not beautiful, she has great charisma and is described as having enormous power over men, being both seductive and manipulative.
Her personality is dominating and demanding, though fragile from the onslaught of poison pen letters.

Literary significance and criticism
"Nothing is more disappointing than the poor work of a good craftsman.  P. D. James, hailed as Christie's successor and in some ways an abler hand at characterization, has given steady proof of her mastery of the genre.  She even created in Cordelia Gray a likable and credible woman investigator.  Here she brings her back, but makes her act like a bewildered maiden, though she heads a London detective agency.  Besides, the plot is full of unlikelihoods, including the reason for the island setting and the crime itself." - A Catalogue of Crime

In a 1982 book review, Julian Symons of The New York Times wrote "'The Skull Beneath the Skin' is perhaps an acknowledgment that she had reached too far, a deliberate step back in the direction of orthodoxy. It is a disappointment to the extent that the criminal results don't flow as they should from the stated motives, but this is still an absorbing story, paced and written with fine calculation, a work quite beyond the scope of more than a very few of her contemporaries."

References

1982 British novels
Novels by P. D. James
Novels set in Dorset
Faber and Faber books
British detective novels